GURPS Uplift is a sourcebook for a science fiction themed role-playing game. It is a part of the extensive GURPS "generic" roleplaying system.

Contents
GURPS Uplift is based on a fictional universe envisioned by David Brin in his influential Uplift Universe series, where biological uplift of animals has become common.

Publication history
GURPS Uplift was written by Stefan Jones and published by Steve Jackson Games in 1990.

It was long out of print, but a 2nd edition was published in September, 2003.

A revised edition was reported to be in preparation in 2018.

Reception

References

Uplift
Role-playing game supplements introduced in 1992
Role-playing games based on novels
Space opera role-playing games